The 2008 Waikato Bay of Plenty Magic season saw Waikato Bay of Plenty Magic compete in the 2008 ANZ Championship. With a team coached by Noeline Taurua, captained by Amigene Metcalfe and featuring Irene van Dyk, Magic finished the season as minor premiers and overall runners-up. During the regular season Magic won 10 of their 13 matches and finished above eventual champions New South Wales Swifts. Magic subsequently lost to Swifts in  the major semi–final, defeated Adelaide Thunderbirds in the preliminary final before losing the grand final to Swifts. Irene van Dyk finished the season as the ANZ Championship top scorer, scoring 529 goals from 570 attempts with a 93% goal rate.

Players

Player movements

Roster

Waipa Pre-Season Tournament
In March 2008 at the Waipa Pre-Season Tournament at the Te Awamutu Event Centre, Magic played four and won four against New South Wales Swifts, Australian Institute of Sport, Canterbury Tactix and Central Pulse.

Regular season

Fixtures and results
Round 1

Round 2

Round 3

Round 4

Round 5

Round 6

Round 7

Round 8

Round 9
 received a bye.
Round 10

Round 11

Round 12

Round 13

Round 14

Final table

Playoffs

Major semi-final

Preliminary final

Grand final

References

2008
2008 ANZ Championship season
2008 in New Zealand netball